Gutland is a 2017 internationally co-produced drama film directed by Govinda Van Maele. It was screened 8 September 2017 in the Discovery section at the 2017 Toronto International Film Festival. In Luxembourg the film was screened for the first time at the Luxembourg City Film Festival 2018. It was selected as the Luxembourgish entry for the Best Foreign Language Film at the 91st Academy Awards, but it was not nominated.

Cast
 Frederick Lau as Jens Fauser
 Vicky Krieps as Lucy Loschetter
 Marco Lorenzini as Jos Gierens
 Pit Bukowski as Marcel
 Leo Folschette as Arno Kleyer

Production
The film, for which a budget of 3 million euros was available, was shot in 37 days during December 2016. It was filmed around Herborn. The film was shot with 35mm. The film was inspired in part by Van Maele's experience growing up as the son of immigrant parents in a small Luxembourgish village.

Reception
On review aggregator website Rotten Tomatoes, the film holds an approval rating of 88% based on 8 reviews, and an average rating of 6/10.

See also
 List of submissions to the 91st Academy Awards for Best Foreign Language Film
 List of Luxembourgish submissions for the Academy Award for Best Foreign Language Film

References

External links
 

2017 films
2017 drama films
Luxembourgian drama films
Luxembourgish-language films
Belgian drama films
French drama films
German drama films
2010s French films
2010s German films